Cruisin' the 'Bird is an album by vibraphonist Bobby Hutcherson featuring performances recorded in 1988 and released on Orrin Keepnews' Landmark label.

Reception

On Allmusic, Scott Yanow observed "Throughout his career, vibraphonist Bobby Hutcherson has recorded one rewarding set after another, always being quite consistent. ... Fine music".

Track listing
All compositions by Bobby Hutcherson except where noted.
 "All or Nothing at All" (Arthur Altman, Jack Lawrence) – 6:48
 "Cruisin' the 'Bird" – 6:09
 "Sierra" – 8:33
 "If You Do" – 6:45 additional track on CD release
 "Imminent Treasures" – 6:39
 "Chelsea Bridge" (Billy Strayhorn) – 5:08
 "Come Rain or Come Shine" (Harold Arlen, Johnny Mercer) – 6:11
 "On the Delta" – 5:42

Personnel
Bobby Hutcherson – vibraphone, marimba
Ralph Moore – soprano saxophone, tenor saxophone
Buddy Montgomery - piano
Rufus Reid – bass
Victor Lewis – drums

References

Landmark Records albums
Bobby Hutcherson albums
1988 albums
Albums produced by Orrin Keepnews